James Paul Stelfox (born 23 March 1976 in Warrington, England) is an English musician, best known as the bassist for Starsailor.

Biography
Stelfox first met Ben Byrne ten years prior to Starsailor forming. They became friends since junior school and they went to Leigh Campus of Wigan and Leigh College, where they finally met Barry Westhead and James Walsh.
 
Stelfox and Byrne started playing in the north west of England for a number of years.  After their singer fell ill, James Walsh decided to join them (before, he was on a school choir).

Stelfox's musically influenced by Neil Young, Paul McCartney and Massive Attack.

See also
Kai Stephens

References 

English bass guitarists
English male guitarists
Male bass guitarists
English rock guitarists
People from Warrington
Living people
1976 births
Starsailor (band) members
21st-century bass guitarists
21st-century British male musicians